Bila Tserkva is a airbase of the Ukrainian Air Force located near Bila Tserkva, Kyiv Oblast, Ukraine.

The base is home to the 1333rd Reserve and Scrap Aviation Base.

The base was home to the 251st Guards Heavy Bomber Aviation Regiment of the Soviet Air Forces between 1951 and 1992 with the Tupolev Tu-16N (ASCC: Badger-A).

References

Ukrainian airbases